Henneseid is a village in Drangedal municipality, Norway.

Villages in Vestfold og Telemark